Antigua 
Comunicaciones
 Heredia
 Juventud Retalteca
 Malacateco
 Marquense
 Mictlán
 Municipal
 Peñarol
 Petapa 
 Suchitepéquez
 Universidad De San Carlos
 Tipografía Nacional
 Xelajú
 Xinabajul
 Zacapa

Guatemala
 
Football clubs
Football clubs